Statistics of the Yemeni League for the 2003–04 season.

Final table

References

External links
 

Yem
Yemeni League seasons
1